The Lewellen State Aid Bridge, near Lewellen, Nebraska, United States, is a historic Pratt pony truss bridge that was built in 1926. It was listed on the National Register of Historic Places in 1992.

Along with the Lisco State Aid Bridge, it is one of two surviving multiple-span "State Aid" bridges in Nebraska, out of eight constructed. It has seven 100-foot-long "riveted Pratt ponies ... supported by 50-foot long, 8-inch Bethlehem H-piles, encased in concrete".  It was built by low bidder on a contract let by Nebraska, for $71,300, during 1926–27.

References

External links 

Road bridges on the National Register of Historic Places in Nebraska
Bridges completed in 1926
Buildings and structures in Garden County, Nebraska
1926 establishments in Nebraska
National Register of Historic Places in Garden County, Nebraska
Truss bridges in the United States